Mister Johnson may refer to:

Mister Johnson (novel), 1939 novel by Irish author Joyce Cary
Mister Johnson (play), 1956 stage adaptation of the novel by Norman Rosten
Mister Johnson (film), 1990 film adaptation of the novel
"Mister Johnson", 1929 American folk song by Uncle Dave Macon and Sid Harkreader

See also
Mr. Johnson (disambiguation)
List of people with surname Johnson